Death Metal is the fourth album by Swedish death metal band, Dismember. It was released on 8 August 1997. The fourth track, "Let The Napalm Rain", opens with a sample from the movie Apocalypse Now.

Track listing

Personnel 
Dismember
Matti Kärki – Vocals
David Blomqvist – Lead Guitars
Robert Sennebäck – Rhythm Guitars
Richard Cabeza – Bass
Fred Estby – Drums, Producer, Engineer
Production
Dismember – Producer
Peter in de Betou – Mastering
Anders Lindström – Engineer
Tomas Skogsberg – Engineer
Alvaro Tapia – Art Direction

Dismember (band) albums
1997 albums
Nuclear Blast albums